Aperel (sometimes written as Aperia) was a vizier of ancient Egypt, who served during the reigns of the 18th Dynasty kings Amenhotep III and Akhenaten. Besides being Vizier, Aperel was also a commander of chariots and had the title God's Father.

Pronunciation and etymology
Aperel was pronounced "something like 'Abdiel ('Abdi-El) meaning "the servant of the god El" according to Alain Zivie.

Family
Aperel's wife was named Taweret. They had at least three sons: Seny, Hatiay and Huy.  Seny was a steward and Hatiay was a priest of Nefertem. Huy, who was a commander of horse, commander of chariots and scribe of recruits of the Lord of the Two Lands, was also buried in the tomb of his parents.

Tomb and burial
Aperel's tomb was discovered in 1987 by the French under supervision of Alain Zivie. Taweret, Aperia's wife, may have been an important lady in her own right as she is the only New Kingdom woman identified to date to have been buried in a set of three coffins. Their son Huy was buried in year 10 of Akhenaten or even later. Also mentioned in the tomb are Aperel’s sons Seny, an official, and Hatiay, a priest.

According to Strouhal, Aperel was 50–60 years old at the time of his death, his wife Taweret was 40–50 years old at the time of her death, and their son Huy was 25–35 years old at the time of his death.

References

14th-century BC Egyptian people
Viziers of the Eighteenth Dynasty of Egypt